Athinhal is a coastal village in Kasaragod district in the Indian state of Kerala. It is 28 km from the district capital of Kasaragod and one kilometer north of Kanhangad.

History
Athinhal, a coastal village in the Kasaragod district, is situated one kilometer north of the town of Kanhangad. The name Athinhal was derived from the Arabic word of "HADIYA" (Gift). The history of Athinhal dates back to Seven Decades, when Assayid Omer Samarkand Waliyullah came to Athinhal from Samarkand (Uzbek: Samarqand, Persian: سمرقند) of Uzbekistan to propagate Islam. The name, Kasaragod, is said to be derived from the word Kusirakood meaning Nuxvomica forests (Kanjirakuttom). The Kasaragod district was formed on 24 May. 1984, with the intention of bestowing maximum attention on the development of backward areas. With the formation of the new district, comprising the erstwhile Kasaragod and Hosdurg taluks, it has become possible to develop this coastal area fruitfully.

Economy
The economy is dependent on the inflow of money from locals employed as migrant workers in the Persian Gulf countries. Ever since the oil boom of the 1970s, the village has witnessed a large-scale migration of young people to the oil producing Gulf countries in pursuit of work. This has changed the economic situation considerably. At least one person from each household is employed in the Gulf. In the past, the economy depended on agriculture. The greenery, which persisted once, has vanished, due to the spurting of concrete structures in the place of paddy fields. Now only the coconut farming survives and less than 5% people depend on agriculture.

Climate
The southwest monsoon starts towards the end of May or the beginning of June, heralded by thunderstorms and remains until September when the rain fades out. October brings in the northeast monsoon. Dry weather sets in by the end of December. January and February are the coolest months of the year. March, April and May are very hot.

Transportation
Local roads have access to NH.66 which connects to Mangalore in the north and Calicut in the south. The nearest railway station is Kanhangad on Mangalore-Palakkad line. There are airports at Mangalore, Kannur and Calicut.

References

Kanhangad area